Sardar Ayaz Sadiq (Punjabi, ; born 17 October 1954) is a Pakistani politician who has been a member of the National Assembly of Pakistan since August 2018. Previously, he was a member of the National Assembly from 2002 to May 2018. He served as the 19th Speaker of the National Assembly of Pakistan from June 2013 to August 2015 and again from November 2015 to August 2018.

Early and personal life

Sadiq was born on 17 October 1954 in Lahore to Chaudhry Sardar Muhammad Sadiq and Attiya Sadiq. He belongs to Arain family hailing from Kasur, Punjab. He completed his education from Aitchison College, Lahore. Imran Khan, Nisar Ali Khan, Pervaiz Khattak, Sardar Akhtar Mengal and Zulfiqar Ali Magsi were amongst his class fellows when Sadiq was enrolled in Aitchison College. In an interview, Sadiq said he was an average student. Sadiq received degree in commerce from Hailey College of Punjab University in 1975.

Sadiq married to Reema Ayaz in 1977, and has a daughter and two sons. Sadiq is a son-in-law of former Chief Justice of Lahore High Court Sardar Iqbal.

Since 1996, Sadiq has been a member of the Lahore Gymkhana Club. Sadiq is a businessman by profession and has had business contracts with Pakistan Railways. He along with members of his family runs a non-profit hospital "Sardar Trust Eye Hospital" in Lahore.

Political career
Sadiq began his political career as a member of the Pakistan Tehreek-e-Insaf (PTI) in the late 1990s when he was a close friend of PTI chairman Imran Khan. Sadiq ran for the seat of Provincial Assembly of the Punjab as a candidate of PTI in 1997 Pakistani general election from Constituency PP-121 Lahore but was unsuccessful. He received 4,541 votes and lost the seat to Pakistan Muslim League (N) (PML-N).

Sadiq left PTI in 1998 owing to differences with Imran Khan and joined PML (N) in 2001.

Sadiq was elected to the National Assembly of Pakistan as a candidate of PML-N from Constituency NA-122 (Lahore-V) on 2002 general election, by defeating Imran Khan. Sadiq claimed "it was a big victory as his leader Nawaz Sharif in exile and Pervez Musharraf, a close aide of Imran Khan at that time, in power". During his tenure as the member of the National Assembly, he remained a member of the National Assembly's Standing Committees on Railways, Finance and Defence Production.

Sadiq was re-elected to the National Assembly as a candidate of PML-N from Constituency NA-122 (Lahore-V) in 2008 general election. During his tenure as the member of the National Assembly, he became the chairman of the National Assembly's Standing Committees on Railways.

Sadiq was re-elected to the National Assembly as a candidate of PML-N from Constituency NA-122 (Lahore-V) in 2013 Pakistani general election, by defeating Imran Khan. In June 2013, Sadiq was elected as the Speaker of the National Assembly of Pakistan.

In 2015, Imran Khan alleged rigging in the constituency of Sadiq from where Sadiq won in 2013 election. Following which the Election Commission of Pakistan de-seated Sadiq and ordered re-polling in the constituency. In October 2015, Sadiq retained his National Assembly seat by defeating a PTI candidate in by-election and was re-elected to the National Assembly for the fourth time. In November 2015, Sadiq retained its position as the speaker of the National Assembly by getting re-elected for the second time and become first person to have been elected as the Speaker of National Assembly for the second time during the same government's tenure in Pakistan.

He was re-elected to the National Assembly as a candidate of PML-N from Constituency NA-129 (Lahore-VII) in 2018 Pakistani general election. On 15 August 2018, he was replaced by Asad Qaiser as speaker of the National Assembly.

He is generally considered a soft-spoken and cool-headed politician in Pakistan. 

In 2020, he made claims about 2019 India–Pakistan border skirmishes that foreign minister Qureshi was "trembling with fear" and insisting to release pilot to avert an Indian invasion. This issue became a row, drawing sharp criticism for him from ISPR and Pakistani government, terming his statements as "irresponsible" and demanding an apology from him. He answered to the controversy and added that statement was being misrepresented. Sadiq added that "Abhinandan had not come to Pakistan to distribute sweets; he had attacked Pakistan and it was a victory for Pakistan when his plane was shot down".

Amid the April 2022 political crisis in Pakistan, when the speaker and the deputy speaker resigned, he was asked to hold voting on no-confidence motion against the prime minister of Pakistan.

References

Living people
1954 births
Pakistani MNAs 2002–2007
Pakistani MNAs 2008–2013
Pakistani MNAs 2013–2018
Pakistani MNAs 2018–2023
Pakistan Muslim League (N) MNAs
Politicians from Lahore
Punjabi people
Aitchison College alumni
Hailey College of Commerce alumni
Speakers of the National Assembly of Pakistan